Otley is a town in West Yorkshire, England.

Otley may also refer to:
Otley, Iowa, US
Otley, Suffolk, England
Otley (film), a 1968 British film
Otley (UK Parliament constituency), 1885–1918
Otley Brewing Company Limited, Welsh Brewery

See also
 Ottley, a surname
 Ottley's, St. Kitts